Travis Hankins was a candidate for the 2010 and 2012 Republican nomination for U.S. Representative for . He is a member of the Republican Party.

Early political activity
Founded and launched the Draft Mike Pence for President Campaign.
Senior Field Representative for Leadership Institute.

U.S. House of Representatives

2010 election
The primary was won by Todd Young.

2012 Congressional campaign

Hankins ran for the 2012 election for the U.S. House, representing Indiana's 6th District. Due to district lines being redrawn, Hankin's hometown of Columbus, which used to be in the 9th Congressional district, is now in the 6th district.  Hankins sought the nomination on the Republican ticket. The primary election, held on May 8, 2012, was won by Luke Messer.

References

External links 
 Hankins for Congress

1972 births
Living people
Indiana University alumni
Indiana Republicans
People from Columbus, Indiana